Colegio Amado Nervo is a private school with two campuses in Colonia Roma Sur, Cuauhtémoc, Mexico City. One campus is dedicated to preschool and primary school while the other is dedicated to middle school (escuela secundaria) and high school (escuela preparatoria).

References

External links
 Colegio Amado Nervo 

High schools in Mexico City
Cuauhtémoc, Mexico City
Private schools in Mexico